The Arboretum de Balaine (20 hectares) is a historic arboretum located in Villeneuve-sur-Allier, Allier, Auvergne, France. It is open daily in the warmer months; an admission fee is charged.

The arboretum was created in 1804 by Aglaé Adanson, daughter of naturalist Michel Adanson, as an English-style park on surrounding a mansion inherited from a family friend. She formed an arboretum of exotic species, following the example of Joséphine de Beauharnais at the Château de Malmaison in Rueil. The family has continued to own the park since its creation, and describe it as the oldest private botanical park in France. It was classified a historical monument in 1993.

Today the arboretum contains about 2500 taxa planted across 200 years, including Acer palmatum, Cypress, Fagus, Carya, Liquidambar, Nyssa, Quercus, and Sassafras, as well as azaleas, camellias, davidias, magnolias, rhododendrons, viburnums, a fine collection of Cornus, and old roses and hydrangeas. Noteworthy specimens include a 36-meter giant sequoia (Sequoiadendron giganteum) planted in 1856, a Sequoia sempervirens, a 45-meter bald cypress from Louisiana planted in 1822, and a 30-meter tupelo (Nyssa sylvatica).

See also 
 List of botanical gardens in France

References

External links
 Arboretum de Balaine
 Parcs et Jardins de France entry (French)

Balaine, Arboretum de
Balaine, Arboretum de